The Quellinusschool or Kunstnijverheidsschool Quellinus, was a school for sculptors in Amsterdam named after the Quellinus family of sculptors, founded in 1877.

It was founded as the Teekenschool voor Kunstambachten (Drawing school for art crafts) by Pierre Cuypers and Eduard Colinet in the workshop of the Rijksmuseum during the building of that institution, which itself contains several large sculptures and was intended to rival the Royal Palace of Amsterdam, which itself is full of works by the Quellinus family. The name was changed after the opening of the museum in 1885 to Kunstnijverheidsschool Quellinus, or simply Quellinusschool. In 1924 it merged with the Gerrit Rietveld Academie.

Currently Royal Dutch Antiquarian Society has an office in the school.

List of directors and teachers
 Eduard Colinet (Eduard), founder and director from 1877
 Cuypers, P.J.H. (Pierre), co-founder
 Heukelom, J.B. (Jan Bertus), Drawing teacher
 Papenhuijzen, W. (Willem), Drawing teacher to 1921
 Laars, T. van der (Tiete), teacher ca. 1900
 Bourgonjon, L.F. (Louis), sculpting teacher who worked for 31 years there
 Wierink, B.W. (Ben), Drawing teacher from 1879
 Bossche, E. van den (Emile), assistant to Eduard Colinet
 Hove, B.J.W.M. van (Bart), director from 1902 to 1908
 Rol, C. (Cornelis), drawing teacher from 1903 to 1931
 Wal, H.A. van der (Hendrik Adriaan), drawing teacher from 1913 to 1948
 Jacobs, J.A. (Jacob  Andries), teacher from 1916 to 1924
 Lauweriks, J.L.M. (Jan/Matthieu), director from 1917
 Nienhuis, L. (Bert), teacher ceramics from 1926
 Stolk, R.J.A. (Reijer), teacher from 1939
 Herder, D. (Dirk) de, teacher photography from 1940 to 1947
 Wildenhain, R.F. (Frans), teacher from 1947 to 1976
 Metz, A. (Lex), teacher graphic arts from 1949
 Gasteren, L.A. van (Louis), teacher from 1952 to 1982
 Elburg, J.G. (Jan), teacher spatial design from 1956 to 1963
 Crouwel, W.H. (Wim), ca. 1900
 Nijhoff, C.W., director from 1938
 Uri, J. (Jan), ca. 1947
 Couzijn, W. (Wessel), ca. 1968
 Kähler, G.M.D.C. (Greta)
 Zwollo, M. (Marinus), teacher of jewelry design from 1949 to 1968

Some notable pupils

 Cris Agterberg (1883-1948)
 Fré Cohen (1903-1943)
 Aart van Dobbenburgh (1899-1988)
 Albert Hahn (1877-1918)
 Flip Hamers (1882-1966)
 Marinus Heijnes (1888-1963)
 Johan van Hell (1889-1952)
 J.B. Heukelom (1875-1965)
 Louise Kaiser (1891-1973)
 Albert Klijn (1895-1981)
 Pieter Kuhn (1910-1966)
 Joseph Mendes da Costa (1863–1939)
 Bert Nienhuis (1873-1960)
 J.J.P. Oud (1890-1963)
 Bertus Sondaar (1904-1984)
 André Vlaanderen (1881-1955)
 Herman Walenkamp (1871-1933)
 Marinus Zwollo (1903-1983)

References

 Muurvast & gebeiteld - Beeldhouwkunst in de bouw 1840-1940, 1997 NAi Uitgevers Rotterdam, 
 Het ontstaan van het kunstnijverheidsonderwijs in Nederland en de geschiedenis van de Quellinusschool te Amsterdam (1879-1924), Martis, A., in 'Nederlands Kunsthistorisch Jaarboek 1979 part 30 (Kunstonderwijs in Nederland)', Haarlem 1980, pg. 79-171

Schools in Amsterdam
Rijksmuseum Amsterdam
1877 establishments in the Netherlands
Dutch artist groups and collectives